Joban Uddin Ahmad is a Bangladesh Jamaat-e-Islami politician and the former Member of Parliament of Nilphamari-3.

Career
Ahmed was elected to parliament from Nilphamari-3 as a Bangladesh Jamaat-e-Islami candidate in 1986.

References

Bangladesh Jamaat-e-Islami politicians
Living people
3rd Jatiya Sangsad members
Year of birth missing (living people)